Niels Lodberg (born October 14, 1980) is a former Danish professional football player who played as a centre-back and current assistant manager of FC Midtjylland.

With his 1,89 m. he is a great force with his head. He has previously played for Lyngby Boldklub, FC Nordsjælland and AC Horsens.

Career
Lodberg started his senior playing career with amateur club Ringkøbing IF from 1998 to 2000. In 2000, he moved to play as an amateur for Lyngby BK. He made his debut in the top-flight Danish Superliga in April 2001, before signing his first professional contract with Lyngby BK in May 2001. Having scored two goals in 19 Superliga games for Lyngby BK, Lodberg moved to Danish 1st Division team Farum BK in January 2002. He helped Farum BK win promotion for the 2002-03 Superliga season. He played 29 Superliga games for Farum, in 2003 renamed FC Nordsjælland, before moving to 1st Division team AC Horsens in 2004.

He scored 21 goals for Horsens in the 2004-05 1st Division season, helping AC Horsens win promotion for the Superliga. Lodberg scored four goals in AC Horsens' first two seasons in the Superliga. On July 18, 2007 Lodberg scored his first goal for AC Horsens in more than a year with a game-winning header against AGF in the 2007-08 Superliga season opener. AC Horsens played four seasons in the Superliga, in which Lodberg scored 11 goals in 109 Superliga games, before being relegated to the 1st Division in the summer 2009.

In the summer of 2012 Lodberg changed to Superliga team SønderjyskE on a -year contract on a free transfer after 8 years in AC Horsens as the two parties failed to reach an agreement for a contract extension in January 2012. In the summer 2015, Lodberg returned to AC Horsens on a 2-year contract.

Coaching career
Lodberg announced his retirement from active football in January 2016. He wanted to focus solely on his coaching duties, as he had been offered a job as an assistant manager at Horsens, which he accepted.

In January 2017 it was confirmed, that Lodberg would return to his former club SønderjyskE from the 2017-18 season, this time as an assistant manager to Claus Nørgaard. The club confirmed his departure in June 2021. However, he returned to SønderjyskE again on 16 December 2021, as he was announced together with newly hired manager Henrik Hansen.

References

External links

1980 births
Living people
Danish men's footballers
Lyngby Boldklub players
FC Nordsjælland players
AC Horsens players
SønderjyskE Fodbold players
Danish Superliga players
Danish 1st Division players
Ringkøbing IF players
Association football defenders
People from Ringkøbing-Skjern Municipality
Sportspeople from the Central Denmark Region